Parapusillimonas is a genus of bacteria from the family of Alcaligenaceae with one known species (Parapusillimonas granuli).

References

Further reading 
 

 

Burkholderiales
Bacteria genera
Monotypic bacteria genera